The team dressage in equestrian at the 1972 Olympic Games in Munich was held at Dressage Facility Nymphenburg on 7 September.

Competition format

The team medals were awarded after the Grand-Prix portion of the individual competition.  After the Grand-Prix portion of the individual event the three rides of each team were added up and the highest score was the winner, all three scores counted towards the final.  Both the team and the individual competitions ran concurrently.

Results

References

Equestrian at the 1972 Summer Olympics